Saint-Junien is a commune in the Haute-Vienne department in the Nouvelle-Aquitaine region in west-central France.  Its sister city is Jumet, Belgium.

History
The history of Saint-Junien began in AD 500, when an ascetic of Hungarian origin, Saint Amand, chose to live on the north bank of the Vienne River at a place called Comodoliac.

Ruricius, bishop of Limoges, offered him a humble cell. At this time, Junian (Junien), originally from the north of France and son of a Count of Cambrai, left his family at the age of 15 and became a disciple of Saint Amand. It is said that Junian knocked on the door of Amand, who did not answer. Junian had to sleep outside, and the snow miraculously spared him during the night. He then lived as a hermit and, after the passing of his master, he lived where the collegiate church stands nowadays.

In 593, Gregory of Tours was impressed by the importance of the pilgrimage to the saint's tomb. An urban area was quickly created around the abbey built in honor of the saint. However, this monastery was destroyed by the Vikings in 866. By the end of the 13th century, high walls were built around the city.

This peculiarity is largely inherited from the importance of the industrial sector of glove making, especially in the nineteenth and twentieth centuries, like Limoges.

Demographics
Inhabitants are known as Saint-Juniauds.

Prominent locals
 Jean-Baptiste-Camille Corot, July 16, 1796 – February 22, 1875) was a French landscape and portrait painter as well as a printmaker in etching. He is a pivotal figure in landscape painting and his vast output simultaneously references the Neo-Classical tradition and anticipates the plein-air innovations of Impressionism.
 Robert Hébras (1925-2023), member of the Resistance, survivor of the SS  massacre at Oradour-sur-Glane.
 Maurice Arreckx (1917-2001), politician.
 Sophie Vouzelaud, first dauphine of Miss France 2007.

Curiosity

 On the day of the American investiture of Donald Trump, his wife Melania Trump wore gloves specially made for the occasion by the Agnelle company, based in Saint-Junien.

See also
 Communes of the Haute-Vienne department

References

External links
 Official website 

Communes of Haute-Vienne
Limousin